Polygonum arenastrum, commonly known as equal-leaved knotgrass, is a summer annual flowering plant in the knotweed family Polygonaceae.  Other common names include  common knotweed, prostrate knotweed, mat grass, oval-leaf knotweed, stone grass, wiregrass, and door weed, as well as many others.  It is native to Europe and can be found on other continents as an introduced species and a common noxious weed. Knotweed was first seen in North America in 1809 and is now seen across much of the United States and Canada.

Description

Knotweed develops a deep tap root (it can be as deep as ), does well in compacted soil, and survives drought conditions. The numerous wiry stems grow out from the center of the plant giving it a mat-like appearance. The stems are very long and branching and grow in a zigzag form. The leaves are alternate, oblong, hairless, can be  to  inches (12 to 37 mm) long, and are bluish-green in color. The leaf stalk is short and closely surrounded by papery stipules on each node. The stem nodes are slightly swollen and look somewhat like "knots", thus its common name, knotweed. Flowers, with colors ranging from white to green, are inconspicuous, have no petals, and grow all along the stems. The sepals, however, are pinkish with white edges. Seeds are egg-shaped, dark reddish brown in color, and have a smooth shiny surface.

In the US, knotweed can be mistaken for the native plant spotted spurge. An easy way to tell the difference is to break off a stem. Spurges contain milky sap; knotweed does not.

Since common knotweed does well in compacted soils, it is commonly found in brown-field sites, roadsides and pavements, driveways and in turf grass (where there is a lot of footpath wear) and in gardens.

Germination and spread
Common knotweed germinates at or near the soil surface in early spring, as soon there is enough moisture, and grows in an upright position before it spreads out like a mat. The seeds, which grow low to the ground, survive mowing and are not disturbed when stepped on by people and animals.

Knotweed is a weed of waste areas but has been showing up in grain fields, where is becomes problematic because of its prolific seed production and long viability. It is also a host for powdery mildew like Erysiphe betae and viruses such as beet ringspot and beet curly top virus.

Taxonomy
Some sources treat Polygonum arenastrum as a subspecies or variety of Polygonum aviculare, while others differentiate.

Eradication
In the home garden, common knotweed is easy to get rid of by hand pulling. Covering garden beds with landscaping fabric and then mulch is a good way to keep knotweed from taking over. If the seeds do germinate in the mulch cover, they are easy to remove. Herbicides are also an option. Pre-emergent herbicides, those that prevent the seed from germinating, are effective, but the area must first be free of weeds for this type of herbicide to work. Post emergent herbicides, those that kill the growing plant by spraying the green leaves of the plant, may be effective if applied when the plant is very young.

To prevent this weed, the soil should be aerated and well-drained. Young weeds should be pulled before they set seed.

References

External links
Jepson Manual Treatment
University of California @ Davis IPM
Calphotos Photo gallery, University of California @ Berkeley
photo of herbarium specimen at Missouri Botanical Garden, collected in Missouri in 1994

arenastrum
Flora of Europe
Plants described in 1857